Suleiman I (6 November 14946 September 1566), commonly known as Suleiman the Magnificent in the West and Suleiman the Lawgiver in his realm, was the tenth and longest-reigning Sultan of the Ottoman Empire from 1520 until his death in 1566. Under his administration, the Ottoman Empire ruled over at least 25 million people.

Suleiman succeeded his father, Selim I, as sultan on 30 September 1520 and began his reign with campaigns against the Christian powers in central Europe and the Mediterranean. Belgrade fell to him in 1521 and the island of Rhodes in 1522–23. At Mohács, in August 1526, Suleiman broke the military strength of Hungary.

Suleiman became a prominent monarch of 16th-century Europe, presiding over the apex of the Ottoman Empire's economic, military and political power. Suleiman personally led Ottoman armies in conquering the Christian strongholds of Belgrade and Rhodes as well as most of Hungary before his conquests were checked at the siege of Vienna in 1529. He annexed much of the Middle East in his conflict with the Safavids and large areas of North Africa as far west as Algeria. Under his rule, the Ottoman fleet dominated the seas from the Mediterranean to the Red Sea and through the Persian Gulf.

At the helm of an expanding empire, Suleiman personally instituted major judicial changes relating to society, education, taxation and criminal law. His reforms, carried out in conjunction with the empire's chief judicial official Ebussuud Efendi, harmonized the relationship between the two forms of Ottoman law: sultanic (Kanun) and religious (Sharia). He was a distinguished poet and goldsmith; he also became a great patron of culture, overseeing the "Golden" age of the Ottoman Empire in its artistic, literary and architectural development.

Breaking with Ottoman tradition, Suleiman married Hürrem Sultan, a woman from his harem, an Orthodox Christian of Ruthenian origin who converted to Islam, and who became famous in the West by the name Roxelana, due to her red hair. Their son, Selim II, succeeded Suleiman following his death in 1566 after 46 years of rule. Suleiman's other potential heirs, Mehmed and Mustafa, had died; Mehmed had died in 1543 from smallpox, and Mustafa had been strangled to death in 1553 at the sultan's order. His other son Bayezid was executed in 1561 on Suleiman's orders, along with Bayezid's four sons, after a rebellion. Although scholars typically regarded the period after his death to be one of crisis and adaptation rather than simple decline, the end of Suleiman's reign was a watershed in Ottoman history. In the decades after Suleiman, the empire began to experience significant political, institutional, and economic changes, a phenomenon often referred to as the Transformation of the Ottoman Empire.

Alternative names and titles 
Suleiman the Magnificent ( Muḥteşem Süleymān), as he was known in the West, was also called Suleiman the First ( Sulṭān Süleymān-ı Evvel), and Suleiman the Lawgiver ( Ḳānūnī Sulṭān Süleymān) for his reform of the Ottoman legal system.

It is unclear when exactly the term Kanunî (the Lawgiver) first came to be used as an epithet for Suleiman. It is entirely absent from sixteenth and seventeenth-century Ottoman sources and may date from the early 18th century.

There is a tradition of western origin, according to which Suleiman the Magnificent was "Suleiman II", but that tradition has been based on an erroneous assumption that Süleyman Çelebi was to be recognised as a legitimate sultan.

Early life 

Suleiman was born in Trabzon on the southern coast of the Black Sea to Şehzade Selim (later Selim I), probably on 6 November 1494, although this date is not known with absolute certainty or evidence. His mother was Hafsa Sultan, a convert to Islam of unknown origins, who died in 1534. At the age of seven, Suleiman began studies of science, history, literature, theology and military tactics in the schools of the imperial Topkapı Palace in Constantinople. As a young man, he befriended Pargalı Ibrahim, a Greek slave who later became one of his most trusted advisers (but who was later executed on Suleiman's orders). At age seventeen, he was appointed as the governor of first Kaffa (Theodosia), then Manisa, with a brief tenure at Edirne.

Accession 
Upon the death of his father, Selim I (r. 1512–1520), Suleiman entered Constantinople and ascended to the throne as the tenth Ottoman Sultan. An early description of Suleiman, a few weeks following his accession, was provided by the Venetian envoy Bartolomeo Contarini:

Military campaigns

Conquests in Europe 

Upon succeeding his father, Suleiman began a series of military conquests, eventually leading to a revolt led by the Ottoman-appointed governor of Damascus in 1521. Suleiman soon made preparations for the conquest of Belgrade from the Kingdom of Hungary—something his great-grandfather Mehmed II had failed to achieve because of John Hunyadi's strong defense in the region. Its capture was vital in removing the Hungarians and Croats who, following the defeats of the Albanians, Bosniaks, Bulgarians, Byzantines and the Serbs, remained the only formidable force who could block further Ottoman gains in Europe. Suleiman encircled Belgrade and began a series of heavy bombardments from an island in the Danube. Belgrade, with a garrison of only 700 men, and receiving no aid from Hungary, fell in August 1521.

The road to Hungary and Austria lay open, but Suleiman turned his attention instead to the Eastern Mediterranean island of Rhodes, the home base of the Knights Hospitaller. Suleiman built a large fortification, Marmaris Castle, that served as a base for the Ottoman Navy. Following the five-month Siege of Rhodes (1522), Rhodes capitulated and Suleiman allowed the Knights of Rhodes to depart. The conquest of the island cost the Ottomans 50,000 to 60,000 dead from battle and sickness (Christian claims went as high as 64,000 Ottoman battle deaths and 50,000 disease deaths).

As relations between Hungary and the Ottoman Empire deteriorated, Suleiman resumed his campaign in Central Europe, and on 29 August 1526 he defeated Louis II of Hungary (1506–1526) at the Battle of Mohács. Upon encountering the lifeless body of King Louis, Suleiman is said to have lamented: "I came indeed in arms against him; but it was not my wish that he should be thus cut off before he scarcely tasted the sweets of life and royalty." While Suleiman was campaigning in Hungary, Turkmen tribes in central Anatolia (in Cilicia) revolted under the leadership of Kalender Çelebi.

Some Hungarian nobles proposed that Ferdinand, who was the ruler of neighboring Austria and tied to Louis II's family by marriage, be King of Hungary, citing previous agreements that the Habsburgs would take the Hungarian throne if Louis died without heirs. However, other nobles turned to the nobleman John Zápolya, who was being supported by Suleiman. Under Charles V and his brother Ferdinand I, the Habsburgs reoccupied Buda and took possession of Hungary. Reacting in 1529, Suleiman marched through the valley of the Danube and regained control of Buda; in the following autumn, his forces laid siege to Vienna. This was to be the Ottoman Empire's most ambitious expedition and the apogee of its drive to the West. With a reinforced garrison of 16,000 men, the Austrians inflicted the first defeat on Suleiman, sowing the seeds of a bitter Ottoman–Habsburg rivalry that lasted until the 20th century. His second attempt to conquer Vienna failed in 1532, as Ottoman forces were delayed by the siege of Güns and failed to reach Vienna. In both cases, the Ottoman army was plagued by bad weather, forcing them to leave behind essential siege equipment, and was hobbled by overstretched supply lines. In 1533 the Treaty of Constantinople was signed by Ferdinand I, in which he acknowledged Ottoman suzerainty and recognised Suleiman as his “father and suzerain”, he also agreed to pay an annual tribute and accepted the Ottoman grand vizier as his brother and equal in rank.

By the 1540s, a renewal of the conflict in Hungary presented Suleiman with the opportunity to avenge the defeat suffered at Vienna. In 1541, the Habsburgs attempted to lay siege to Buda but were repulsed, and more Habsburg fortresses were captured by the Ottomans in two consecutive campaigns in 1541 and 1544 as a result, Ferdinand and Charles were forced to conclude a humiliating five-year treaty with Suleiman. Ferdinand renounced his claim to the Kingdom of Hungary and was forced to pay a fixed yearly sum to the Sultan for the Hungarian lands he continued to control. Of more symbolic importance, the treaty referred to Charles V not as 'Emperor' but as the 'King of Spain', leading Suleiman to identify as the true 'Caesar'.

In 1552, Suleiman's forces laid siege of Eger, located in the northern part of the Kingdom of Hungary, but the defenders led by István Dobó repelled the attacks and defended the Eger Castle.

Ottoman–Safavid War 

Suleiman's father had made war with Persia a high priority.  At first, Suleiman shifted attention to Europe and was content to contain Persia, which was preoccupied by its own enemies to its east. After Suleiman stabilized his European frontiers, he now turned his attention to Persia, the base for the rival Islamic faction of Shi'a.  The Safavid dynasty became the main enemy after two episodes. First, Shah Tahmasp killed  the Baghdad governor loyal to Suleiman, and put his own man in. Second, the governor of Bitlis had defected and sworn allegiance to the Safavids. As a result, in 1533, Suleiman ordered his Pargalı Ibrahim Pasha to lead an army into eastern Asia Minor where he retook Bitlis and occupied Tabriz without resistance. Suleiman joined Ibrahim in 1534. They made a push towards Persia, only to find the Shah sacrificing territory instead of facing a pitched battle, resorting to harassment of the Ottoman army as it proceeded along the harsh interior. In 1535 Suleiman made a grand entrance into Baghdad. He enhanced his local support by restoring the tomb of Abu Hanifa, the founder of the Hanafi school of Islamic law to which the Ottomans adhered.

Attempting to defeat the Shah once and for all, Suleiman embarked upon a second campaign in 1548–1549. As in the previous attempt, Tahmasp avoided confrontation with the Ottoman army and instead chose to retreat, using scorched earth tactics in the process and exposing the Ottoman army to the harsh winter of the Caucasus. Suleiman abandoned the campaign with temporary Ottoman gains in Tabriz and the Urmia region, a lasting presence in the province of Van, control of the western half of Azerbaijan and some forts in Georgia.

In 1553 Suleiman began his third and final campaign against the Shah. Having initially lost territories in Erzurum to the Shah's son, Suleiman retaliated by recapturing Erzurum, crossing the Upper Euphrates and laying waste to parts of Persia. The Shah's army continued its strategy of avoiding the Ottomans, leading to a stalemate from which neither army made any significant gain. In 1555, a settlement known as the Peace of Amasya was signed, which defined the borders of the two empires. By this treaty, Armenia and Georgia were divided equally between the two, with Western Armenia, western Kurdistan, and western Georgia (incl. western Samtskhe) falling in Ottoman hands while Eastern Armenia, eastern Kurdistan, and eastern Georgia (incl. eastern Samtskhe) stayed in Safavid hands. The Ottoman Empire obtained most of Iraq, including Baghdad, which gave them access to the Persian Gulf, while the Persians retained their former capital Tabriz and all their other northwestern territories in the Caucasus and as they were prior to the wars, such as Dagestan and all of what is now Azerbaijan.

Campaigns in the Indian Ocean 

Ottoman ships had been sailing in the Indian Ocean since the year 1518. Ottoman admirals such as Hadim Suleiman Pasha, Seydi Ali Reis and Kurtoğlu Hızır Reis are known to have voyaged to the Mughal imperial ports of Thatta, Surat and Janjira. The Mughal Emperor Akbar the Great himself is known to have exchanged six documents with Suleiman the Magnificent.

Suleiman led several naval campaigns against the Portuguese in an attempt to remove them and reestablish trade with the Mughal Empire. Aden in Yemen was captured by the Ottomans in 1538, in order to provide an Ottoman base for raids against Portuguese possessions on the western coast of the Mughal Empire. Sailing on, the Ottomans failed against the Portuguese at the siege of Diu in September 1538, but then returned to Aden, where they fortified the city with 100 pieces of artillery. From this base, Sulayman Pasha managed to take control of the whole country of Yemen, also taking Sana'a.

With its strong control of the Red Sea, Suleiman successfully managed to dispute control of the trade routes to the Portuguese and maintained a significant level of trade with the Mughal Empire throughout the 16th century.

From 1526 until 1543, Suleiman stationed over 900 Turkish soldiers to fight alongside the Somali Adal Sultanate led by Ahmad ibn Ibrahim al-Ghazi during the Conquest of Abyssinia. After the first Ajuran-Portuguese war, the Ottoman Empire would in 1559 absorb the weakened Adal Sultanate into its domain. This expansion furthered Ottoman rule in Somalia and the Horn of Africa. This also increased its influence in the Indian Ocean to compete with the Portuguese Empire with its close ally, the Ajuran Empire.

In 1564, Suleiman received an embassy from Aceh (a sultanate on Sumatra, in modern Indonesia), requesting Ottoman support against the Portuguese. As a result, an Ottoman expedition to Aceh was launched, which was able to provide extensive military support to the Acehnese.

The discovery of new maritime trade routes by Western European states allowed them to avoid the Ottoman trade monopoly. The Portuguese discovery of the Cape of Good Hope in 1488 initiated a series of Ottoman-Portuguese naval wars in the Ocean throughout the 16th century. The Ajuran Sultanate allied with the Ottomans defied the Portuguese economic monopoly in the Indian Ocean by employing a new coinage which followed the Ottoman pattern, thus proclaiming an attitude of economic independence in regard to the Portuguese.

Mediterranean and North Africa 

Having consolidated his conquests on land, Suleiman was greeted with the news that the fortress of Koroni in Morea (the modern Peloponnese, peninsular Greece) had been lost to Charles V's admiral, Andrea Doria. The presence of the Spanish in the Eastern Mediterranean concerned Suleiman, who saw it as an early indication of Charles V's intention to rival Ottoman dominance in the region. Recognizing the need to reassert naval preeminence in the Mediterranean, Suleiman appointed an exceptional naval commander in the form of Khair ad Din, known to Europeans as Barbarossa. Once appointed admiral-in-chief, Barbarossa was charged with rebuilding the Ottoman fleet.

In 1535, Charles V led a Holy League of 26,700 soldiers (10,000 Spaniards, 8,000 Italians, 8,000 Germans, and 700 Knights of St. John) to victory against the Ottomans at Tunis, which together with the war against Venice the following year, led Suleiman to accept proposals from Francis I of France to form an alliance against Charles. Huge Muslim territories in North Africa were annexed. The piracy carried on thereafter by the Barbary pirates of North Africa can be seen in the context of the wars against Spain.

In 1541, the Spaniards led an unsuccessful expedition to Algiers. In 1542, facing a common Habsburg enemy during the Italian Wars, Francis I sought to renew the Franco-Ottoman alliance. In early 1542, Polin successfully negotiated the details of the alliance, with the Ottoman Empire promising to send 60,000 troops against the territories of the German king Ferdinand, as well as 150 galleys against Charles, while France promised to attack Flanders, harass the coasts of Spain with a naval force, and send 40 galleys to assist the Turks for operations in the Levant.

In August 1551, Ottoman naval commander Turgut Reis attacked and captured Tripoli which had been a possession of the Knights of Malta since 1530. In 1553, Turgut Reis was nominated commander of Tripoli by Suleiman, making the city an important center for piratical raids in the Mediterranean and the capital of the Ottoman province of Tripolitania. In 1560, a powerful naval force was sent to recapture Tripoli, but that force was defeated in the Battle of Djerba.

Elsewhere in the Mediterranean, when the Knights Hospitallers were re-established as the Knights of Malta in 1530, their actions against Muslim navies quickly drew the ire of the Ottomans, who assembled another massive army in order to dislodge the Knights from Malta. The Ottomans invaded Malta in 1565, undertaking the Great Siege of Malta, which began on 18 May and lasted until 8 September, and is portrayed vividly in the frescoes of Matteo Perez d'Aleccio in the Hall of St. Michael and St. George. At first, it seemed that this would be a repeat of the battle on Rhodes, with most of Malta's cities destroyed and half the Knights killed in battle; but a relief force from Spain entered the battle, resulting in the loss of 10,000 Ottoman troops and the victory of the local Maltese citizenry.

Legal and political reforms 

While Sultan Suleiman was known as "the Magnificent" in the West, he was always Kanuni Suleiman or "The Lawgiver" to his Ottoman subjects. The overriding law of the empire was the Shari'ah, or Sacred Law, which as the divine law of Islam was outside of the Sultan's powers to change. Yet an area of distinct law known as the Kanuns (canonical legislation) was dependent on Suleiman's will alone, covering areas such as criminal law, land tenure and taxation. He collected all the judgments that had been issued by the nine Ottoman Sultans who preceded him. After eliminating duplications and choosing between contradictory statements, he issued a single legal code, all the while being careful not to violate the basic laws of Islam. It was within this framework that Suleiman, supported by his Grand Mufti Ebussuud, sought to reform the legislation to adapt to a rapidly changing empire. When the Kanun laws attained their final form, the code of laws became known as the kanun‐i Osmani, or the "Ottoman laws". Suleiman's legal code was to last more than three hundred years.

The Sultan also played a role in protecting the Jewish subjects of his empire for centuries to come. In late 1553 or 1554, on the suggestion of his favorite doctor and dentist, the Spanish Jew Moses Hamon, the Sultan issued a firman formally denouncing blood libels against the Jews. Furthermore, Suleiman enacted new criminal and police legislation, prescribing a set of fines for specific offenses, as well as reducing the instances requiring death or mutilation. In the area of taxation, taxes were levied on various goods and produce, including animals, mines, profits of trade, and import-export duties.

Higher medreses provided education of university status, whose graduates became imams or teachers. Educational centers were often one of many buildings surrounding the courtyards of mosques, others included libraries, baths, soup kitchens, residences and hospitals for the benefit of the public.

The arts under Suleiman 

Under Suleiman's patronage, the Ottoman Empire entered the golden age of its cultural development. Hundreds of imperial artistic societies (called the  Ehl-i Hiref, "Community of the Craftsmen") were administered at the Imperial seat, the Topkapı Palace. After an apprenticeship, artists and craftsmen could advance in rank within their field and were paid commensurate wages in quarterly annual installments. Payroll registers that survive testify to the breadth of Suleiman's patronage of the arts, the earliest of the documents dating from 1526 list 40 societies with over 600 members. The Ehl-i Hiref attracted the empire's most talented artisans to the Sultan's court, both from the Islamic world and from the recently conquered territories in Europe, resulting in a blend of Arabic, Turkish and European cultures. Artisans in service of the court included painters, book binders, furriers, jewellers and goldsmiths. Whereas previous rulers had been influenced by Persian culture (Suleiman's father, Selim I, wrote poetry in Persian), Suleiman's patronage of the arts saw the Ottoman Empire assert its own artistic legacy.

Suleiman himself was an accomplished poet, writing in Persian and Turkish under the takhallus (nom de plume) Muhibbi ("Lover"). Some of Suleiman's verses have become Turkish proverbs, such as the well-known Everyone aims at the same meaning, but many are the versions of the story. When his young son Mehmed died in 1543, he composed a moving chronogram to commemorate the year: Peerless among princes, my Sultan Mehmed. In Turkish the chronogram reads  (Şehzadeler güzidesi Sultan Muhammed'üm), in which the Arabic Abjad numerals total 955, the equivalent in the Islamic calendar of 1543 AD. In addition to Suleiman's own work, many great talents enlivened the literary world during Suleiman's rule, including Fuzûlî and Bâkî. The literary historian Elias John Wilkinson Gibb observed that "at no time, even in Turkey, was greater encouragement given to poetry than during the reign of this Sultan". Suleiman's most famous verse is:

The people think of wealth and power as the greatest fate,
But in this world a spell of health is the best state.
What men call sovereignty is a worldly strife and constant war;
Worship of God is the highest throne, the happiest of all estates.

Suleiman also became renowned for sponsoring a series of monumental architectural developments within his empire. The Sultan sought to turn Constantinople into the center of Islamic civilization by a series of projects, including bridges, mosques, palaces and various charitable and social establishments. The greatest of these were built by the Sultan's chief architect, Mimar Sinan, under whom Ottoman architecture reached its zenith. Sinan became responsible for over three hundred monuments throughout the empire, including his two masterpieces, the Süleymaniye and Selimiye mosques—the latter built in Adrianople (now Edirne) in the reign of Suleiman's son Selim II. Suleiman also restored the Dome of the Rock in Jerusalem and the Walls of Jerusalem (which are the current walls of the Old City of Jerusalem), renovated the Kaaba in Mecca, and constructed a complex in Damascus.

Tulips
Suleiman loved gardens and his shaykh grew a white tulip in one of the gardens. Some of the nobles in the court had seen the tulip and they also began growing their own. Soon images of the tulip were woven into rugs and fired into ceramics. Suleiman is credited with large-scale cultivation of the tulip and it is thought that the tulips spread throughout Europe because of Suleiman. It is thought that diplomats who visited him were gifted the flowers while visiting his court.

Personal life

Wives and concubines 
Suleiman had two known consorts, though in total there were 17 women in his harem when he was a Şehzade. The mothers of Mahmud, Murad and Raziye are unknown.

 Mahidevran Hatun, a Circassian or Albanian concubine.
 Hürrem Sultan (also known as Roxelana) (m. 1533 or 1534), Suleiman's concubine and later legal wife and first Haseki Sultan, possibly a daughter of a Ruthenian Orthodox priest.

Sons 
Suleiman I had eight sons:
 Şehzade Mahmud (1512, Manisa Palace, Manisa – 29 October 1520, Topkapı Palace, Istanbul, buried in Yavuz Selim Mosque);
 Şehzade Mustafa (1515, Manisa Palace, Manisa – executed, by the order of his father, on 6 October 1553, Konya, buried in Muradiye Complex, Bursa), son with Mahidevran;
 Şehzade Murad (1519, Manisa Palace, Manisa – 19 October 1520, Topkapı Palace, Istanbul, buried in Yavuz Selim Mosque);
 Şehzade Mehmed (1521, Topkapı Palace, Istanbul – 6 November 1543, Manisa Palace, Manisa, buried in Şehzade Mosque, Istanbul), son with Hürrem;
 Sultan Selim II (30 May 1524, Topkapı Palace, Istanbul – 12/15 December 1574, Topkapı Palace, Istanbul, buried in Selim II Mausoleum, Hagia Sophia Mosque), son with Hürrem;
 Şehzade Abdullah (c.1525, Topkapı Palace, Istanbul  – c.1528, Topkapı Palace, Istanbul, buried in Yavuz Selim Mosque), son with Hürrem
 Şehzade Bayezid (1527, Topkapı Palace, Istanbul – executed by agents of his father on 25 September 1561, Qazvin, Safavid Empire, buried in Melik-i Acem Türbe, Sivas), son with Hürrem;
 Şehzade Cihangir (9 December 1531, Topkapı Palace, Istanbul – 27 November 1553, Konya, buried in Şehzade Mosque, Istanbul), son with Hürrem

Daughters 
Raziye Sultan (c.1517 - 1520, buried in Yahya Efendi Türbe), daughter with unknown woman
 Mihrimah Sultan (1522, Topkapı Palace, Istanbul – 25 January 1578, buried in Suleiman I Mausoleum, Süleymaniye Mosque), daughter with Hürrem. She married Damat Rüstem Pasha in 1539, and had one daughter and one son.
Ayşe Hümaşah Sultan (1542 Istanbul – died 1595, buried in Mihrimah Sultan Mosque Edirnekapı), married in 1560 to Damad Şemsi Ahmed Pasha
Sultanzade Osman Bey (born 1545 and died 1575, Istanbul, buried in Mihrimah Sultan Mosque Üskudar)

Relationship with Hurrem Sultan 

Suleiman was infatuated with Hurrem Sultan, a harem girl from Ruthenia, then part of Poland. Western diplomats, taking notice of the palace gossip about her, called her "Russelazie" or "Roxelana", referring to her Ruthenian origins. The daughter of an Orthodox priest, she was captured by Tatars from Crimea, sold as a slave in Constantinople, and eventually rose through the ranks of the Harem to become Suleiman's favorite. Hurrem, a former concubine, became the legal wife of the Sultan, much to the astonishment of the observers in the palace and the city. He also allowed Hurrem Sultan to remain with him at court for the rest of her life, breaking another tradition—that when imperial heirs came of age, they would be sent along with the imperial concubine who bore them to govern remote provinces of the Empire, never to return unless their progeny succeeded to the throne.

Under his pen name, Muhibbi, Sultan Suleiman composed this poem for Hurrem Sultan:
Throne of my lonely niche, my wealth, my love, my moonlight.
My most sincere friend, my confidant, my very existence, my Sultan, my one and only love.
The most beautiful among the beautiful ...
My springtime, my merry faced love, my daytime, my sweetheart, laughing leaf ...
My plants, my sweet, my rose, the one only who does not distress me in this room ...
My Istanbul, my karaman, the earth of my Anatolia
My Badakhshan, my Baghdad and Khorasan
My woman of the beautiful hair, my love of the slanted brow, my love of eyes full of misery ...
I'll sing your praises always
I, lover of the tormented heart, Muhibbi of the eyes full of tears, I am happy.

Grand Vizier Pargalı Ibrahim Pasha 

Before his downfall, Pargalı Ibrahim Pasha was an inseparable friend and lover of Suleiman. In fact, he is referred to by his chroniclers as 'the favourite' (Maḳbūl) along with 'the executed' (Maḳtūl). Historians state that Suleiman I is remembered for 'his passion for two of his slaves: for his beloved Ibrahim when the sultan was a hot-blooded youth, and for his beloved Hurrem when he was mature.'

Ibrahim was originally a Christian from Parga (in Epirus), who was captured in a raid during the 1499–1503 Ottoman–Venetian War, and was given as a slave to Suleiman most likely in 1514. Ibrahim converted to Islam and Suleiman made him the royal falconer, then promoted him to first officer of the Royal Bedchamber. It was reported that they slept together in the same bed. The sultan also built Ibrahim a lavish palace on the ancient Hippodrome, Istanbul's main forum outside the Hagia Sophia and Topkapı Palace. Despite his following marriage and his new sumptuous residence, Ibrahim sometimes spent the night with Suleiman I at Topkapı Palace. In turn, the sultan occasionally slept at Ibrahim's lodgings. Ibrahim Pasha rose to Grand Vizier in 1523 and commander-in-chief of all the armies. Suleiman also conferred upon Ibrahim Pasha the honor of beylerbey of Rumelia (first-ranking military governor-general), granting Ibrahim authority over all Ottoman territories in Europe, as well as command of troops residing within them in times of war. At the time, Ibrahim was only about thirty years old and lacked any actual military expertise; it is said that 'tongues wagged' at this unprecedented promotion straight from palace service to the two highest offices of the empire.

During his thirteen years as Grand Vizier, his rapid rise to power and vast accumulation of wealth had made Ibrahim many enemies at the Sultan's court. Suleiman's suspicion of Ibrahim was worsened by a quarrel between the latter and the finance secretary (defterdar) İskender Çelebi. The dispute ended in the disgrace of Çelebi on charges of intrigue, with Ibrahim convincing Suleiman to sentence the defterdar to death. Ibrahim also supported Şehzade Mustafa as the successor of Suleiman. This caused disputes between him and Hürrem Sultan, who wanted her sons to succeed to the throne. Ibrahim eventually fell from grace with the Sultan and his wife. Suleiman consulted his Qadi, who suggested that Ibrahim be put to death. The Sultan recruited assassins and ordered them to strangle Ibrahim in his sleep.

Succession 
Sultan Suleiman's two known consorts (Hürrem and Mahidevran) had borne him six sons, four of whom survived past the 1550s. They were Mustafa, Selim, Bayezid, and Cihangir. Of these, the eldest was not Hürrem's son, but rather Mahidevran's. Hürrem is usually held at least partly responsible for the intrigues in nominating a successor, though there is no evidence to support this. Although she was Suleiman's wife, she exercised no official public role. This did not, however, prevent Hürrem from wielding powerful political influence. Since the Empire lacked, until the reign of Ahmed I, any formal means of nominating a successor, successions usually involved the death of competing princes in order to avert civil unrest and rebellions.

By 1552, when the campaign against Persia had begun with Rüstem appointed commander-in-chief of the expedition, intrigues against Mustafa began. Rüstem sent one of Suleiman's most trusted men to report that since Suleiman was not at the head of the army, the soldiers thought the time had come to put a younger prince on the throne; at the same time, he spread rumours that Mustafa had proved receptive to the idea. Angered by what he came to believe were Mustafa's plans to claim the throne, the following summer upon return from his campaign in Persia, Suleiman summoned him to his tent in the Ereğli valley. When Mustafa entered his father's tent to meet with him, Suleiman's eunuchs attacked Mustafa, and after a long struggle the mutes killed him using a bow-string.

Cihangir is said to have died of grief a few months after the news of his half-brother's murder. The two surviving brothers, Selim and Bayezid, were given command in different parts of the empire. Within a few years, however, civil war broke out between the brothers, each supported by his loyal forces. With the aid of his father's army, Selim defeated Bayezid in Konya in 1559, leading the latter to seek refuge with the Safavids along with his four sons. Following diplomatic exchanges, the Sultan demanded from the Safavid Shah that Bayezid be either extradited or executed. In return for large amounts of gold, the Shah allowed a Turkish executioner to strangle Bayezid and his four sons in 1561, clearing the path for Selim's succession to the throne five years later.

Death 

On 6 September 1566, Suleiman, who had set out from Constantinople to command an expedition to Hungary, died before an Ottoman victory at the Siege of Szigetvár in Hungary at the age of 71 and his Grand Vizier Sokollu Mehmed Pasha kept his death secret during the retreat for the enthronement of Selim II.  The sultan's body was taken back to Istanbul to be buried, while his heart, liver, and some other organs were buried in Turbék, outside Szigetvár. A mausoleum constructed above the burial site came to be regarded as a holy place and pilgrimage site. Within a decade a mosque and Sufi hospice were built near it, and the site was protected by a salaried garrison of several dozen men.

Legacy 

The formation of Suleiman's legacy began even before his death. Throughout his reign literary works were commissioned praising Suleiman and constructing an image of him as an ideal ruler, most significantly by Celalzade Mustafa, chancellor of the empire from 1534 to 1557. Later Ottoman writers applied this idealised image of Suleiman to the Near Eastern literary genre of advice literature named naṣīḥatnāme, urging sultans to conform to his model of rulership and to maintain the empire's institutions in their sixteenth-century form. Such writers were pushing back against the political and institutional transformation of the empire after the middle of the sixteenth century, and portrayed deviation from the norm as it had existed under Suleiman as evidence of the decline of the empire. Western historians, failing to recognise that these 'decline writers' were working within an established literary genre and often had deeply personal reasons for criticizing the empire, long took their claims at face value and consequently adopted the idea that the empire entered a period of decline after the death of Suleiman. Since the 1980s this view has been thoroughly reexamined, and modern scholars have come to overwhelmingly reject the idea of decline, labelling it an "untrue myth".

Suleiman's conquests had brought under the control of the Empire major Muslim cities (such as Baghdad), many Balkan provinces (reaching present day Croatia and Hungary), and most of North Africa. His expansion into Europe had given the Ottoman Turks a powerful presence in the European balance of power. Indeed, such was the perceived threat of the Ottoman Empire under the reign of Suleiman that Austria's ambassador Busbecq warned of Europe's imminent conquest: "On [the Turks'] side are the resources of a mighty empire, strength unimpaired, habituation to victory, endurance of toil, unity, discipline, frugality and watchfulness ... Can we doubt what the result will be? ... When the Turks have settled with Persia, they will fly at our throats supported by the might of the whole East; how unprepared we are I dare not say." Suleiman's legacy was not, however, merely in the military field. The French traveler Jean de Thévenot bears witness a century later to the "strong agricultural base of the country, the well being of the peasantry, the abundance of staple foods and the pre-eminence of organization in Suleiman's government".

Even thirty years after his death, "Sultan Solyman" was quoted by the English playwright William Shakespeare as a military prodigy in The Merchant of Venice, where the Prince of Morocco boasts about his prowess by saying that he defeated Suleiman in three battles (Act 2, Scene 1).

Through the distribution of court patronage, Suleiman also presided over a Golden Age in Ottoman arts, witnessing immense achievement in the realms of architecture, literature, art, theology and philosophy. Today the skyline of the Bosphorus and of many cities in modern Turkey and the former Ottoman provinces, are still adorned with the architectural works of Mimar Sinan. One of these, the Süleymaniye Mosque, is the final resting place of Suleiman: he is buried in a domed mausoleum attached to the mosque.

Nevertheless, assessments of Suleiman's reign have frequently fallen into the trap of the Great Man theory of history. The administrative, cultural, and military achievements of the age were a product not of Suleiman alone, but also of the many talented figures who served him, such as grand viziers Ibrahim Pasha and Rüstem Pasha, the Grand Mufti Ebussuud Efendi, who played a major role in legal reform, and chancellor and chronicler Celalzade Mustafa, who played a major role in bureaucratic expansion and in constructing Suleiman's legacy.

In an inscription dating from 1537 on the citadel of Bender, Moldova, Suleiman the Magnificent gave expression to his power:

Suleiman is present on one of the 23 relief portraits over the gallery doors of the House Chamber of the United States Capitol that depicts historical figures noted for their work in establishing the principles that underlie American law.

See also
 List of revolts during Suleiman's reign
 Muhteşem Yüzyıl

Notes

References

Printed sources

 
 
 
 
 
 Clot, André. Suleiman the magnificent (Saqi, 2012).
 Garnier, Edith L'Alliance Impie Editions du Felin, 2008, Paris  Interview
 
 
 
 Lybyer, Albert Howe. The Government of the Ottoman Empire in the Time of Suleiman the Magnificent (Harvard UP, 1913) online. 
 
 Norwich, John Julius. Four princes: Henry VIII, Francis I, Charles V, Suleiman the Magnificent and the obsessions that forged modern Europe (Grove/Atlantic, 2017) popular history.

Additional on-line sources

  Based on original work by Linda Komaroff.

Further reading 

 
 ; deals with Suleiman 1494–1566 
 Lamb, Harold. Suleiman the Magnificent Sultan of the East (1951) online
 Necipoğlu, Gülru. The Age of Sinan: Architectural Culture in the Ottoman Empire (Princeton University Press, 2005)
 Parry, V. J. "The Ottoman Empire, 1520–1566." in The New Cambridge Modern History II: The Reformation 1520–1559 (2nd ed 1990): 570–594 online
 Yermolenko, Galina I., ed. Roxolana in European literature, history and culture  (Routledge, 2016)

External links 

 Portraits and Tughra of Suleiman

 
1494 births
1566 deaths
16th-century Ottoman sultans
Filicides
Islam and Judaism
Divan poets from the Ottoman Empire
Ottoman people of the Ottoman–Persian Wars
Ottoman people of the Ottoman–Venetian Wars
Ottoman period in Hungary
Turks from the Ottoman Empire
People from Trabzon
People of Turkic descent
Turkic rulers
Turkish poets
Turkish Muslims
Custodian of the Two Holy Mosques